Paris By Night 78: Đường Xưa (The Path of the Past) is a Paris By Night program produced by Thúy Nga that was filmed at the Canadian Broadcasting Centre Studio #40 in Toronto, Canada on June 11, 2005.  The MC's were Nguyễn Ngọc Ngạn and Nguyễn Cao Kỳ Duyên. Seats are limited to a studio audience and is considered a private event.

Concept

Following the tradition of honoring famous Vietnamese composers, the program features songs from the three composers: Quốc Dũng, Châu Kỳ, and Tùng Giang.

Track list

Disc 1

Quốc Dũng

 Chỉ Là Mùa Thu Rơi (Lời Việt: Nguyễn Đức Cường) – Khánh Hà
 Ngại Ngùng (Thơ: Xuân Kỷ) – Như Quỳnh
 Liên Khúc:
Quê Hương Và Mộng Ước
Biển Mộng
Bên Nhau Ngày Vui
- Thanh Mai & Quốc Dũng

Châu Kỳ

- Phương Hồng Quế & Trúc Mai

Disc 2
 Phần Đầu
 Hương Giang Còn Tôi Chờ – Quang Lê
 Xin Làm Người Tình Cô Đơn (Lời Việt: Hồ Đình Phương) – Thái Châu
 Hài Kịch: Ru Lại Câu Hò (Hoài Linh) – Hoài Linh & Chí Tài

Tùng Giang

Behind the Scenes (Hậu Trường Sân Khấu)
Quảng Cáo Sản Phẩm Mới (Ads)

Paris by Night

vi:Paris By Night 78